Acronicta lepetita is a moth of the family Noctuidae. It is found in North America, including Texas.

References 

Acronicta
Moths of North America
Moths described in 1908